The Oxley Barn, near Quinter in Gove County, Kansas, is a wood-framed barn with a Gambrel roof. It was built in 1911 and expanded later. It was listed on the National Register of Historic Places in 2008.

It was built by Benjamin Franklin Oxley upon a concrete foundation.

It was expanded by construction of a lean-to a few years after its original construction in 1911.

It has also been known as the Big Red Barn. A black and white photo from the 1930s shows a farmer and horses in front of the large barn.

It can be seen for miles, including from the Interstate 70.

References

External links

Barns on the National Register of Historic Places in Kansas
National Register of Historic Places in Gove County, Kansas
Buildings and structures completed in 1911
1911 establishments in Kansas